Karl Nicklas Gustavsson was a Swedish composer, producer and choir conductor. He was born on April 20, 1972 and studied music theory and composition with Maurice Karkoff, Johan Jeverud, Fredrik Glans and Armand Gutheim before moving to London in 2001 to study composition at the Guildhall School of Music and Drama with Matthew King.  He died on 4th March 2021 after a short illness.

His compositions include three symphonies, orchestral works, chamber music, songs, choral works and music for the stage.

Principal Works 

Poem no.1 for two pianos
Duo for two horns
The Lost Item, miniature opera in one act
Birdsongs for wind quintet
Sonatina for violin and piano
Concertino for guitar, oboe and string orchestra
Sonatina for horn and piano

References 

1972 births
Swedish composers
Swedish male composers
Living people